Monreal is a Catalan surname, originally given to people from Montréal, Aude in France or Mont-ral in Spain. Notable people with the surname include:

Iñigo Monreal (born 1974), Spanish track and field athlete
Nacho Monreal (born 1986), Spanish footballer
Ricardo Monreal (born 1960), Mexican politician
Alejandro Monreal (born 1880)
World leader

References

Catalan-language surnames